The Baltimore Ravens are a professional American football franchise based in Baltimore, Maryland. They are a member club of the American Football Conference (AFC) North division in the National Football League (NFL); from 1996 to 2001, they played in the AFC Central. The team began play in the 1996 season as a result of former Cleveland Browns team owner Art Modell's decision to move the Browns to Baltimore.

The Ravens have won two Super Bowl championships in franchise history: in 2000, when the team defeated the New York Giants 34–7 in Super Bowl XXXV; and in 2012, when the team defeated the San Francisco 49ers 34–31 in Super Bowl XLVII. They are one of two teams (the other being the Tampa Bay Buccaneers) to be undefeated in multiple Super Bowls. Until their defeat by the Ravens in Super Bowl XLVII, the 49ers were the only team to never lose in the Super Bowl with multiple appearances.

Seasons

All-time records
Note: Statistics are correct .

References

Seasons
 
Baltimore Ravens